Hamzah Haz (born 15 February 1940) is an Indonesian politician who served as the 9th vice president of Indonesia from 2001 to 2004 under President Megawati Sukarnoputri. Prior to serving as vice president, Hamzah served as a cabinet minister and a member of the People's Representative Council (DPR). He also chaired the United Development Party (PPP) from 1998 to 2007, and was the party's presidential candidate in the 2004 Indonesian presidential election.

Career

Hamzah was a newspaper journalist in his home town of Pontianak, on the island of Borneo, and later taught economics at Tanjungpura University.

His political career began in 1968 as a member of the West Kalimantan Provincial Representative Council. He later moved to Jakarta, became a member of the Parliament in 1971, first as a member of the Muslim Nahdlatul Ulama Party. After the political fusion which joined all Islamist parties into one party and the withdrawal of Nahdlatul Ulama from politics, he became in 1973 a member of the newly formed Partai Persatuan Pembangunan (PPP).

Hamzah served as Minister for Investment under President B. J. Habibie, who replaced Suharto, then resigned that post to lead the PPP in the 1999 elections. He joined the cabinet of President Abdurrahman Wahid, then became the first to quit Wahid's first cabinet, resigning as Minister for People's Welfare after just two months.

He became a vocal critic of Wahid, but he is also known for his ability to compromise. By the time of Wahid's impeachment in the summer of 2001, Hamzah was leader of the PPP, then the third-largest party in the Indonesian Parliament. As such, he became the obvious choice for the members of People's Consultative Assembly to fill the vacancy of Vice President's office, as Megawati Sukarnoputri moved up to the Presidency.

In the 2004 presidential election, Hamzah was one of the presidential candidates, running with Agum Gumelar. The pair finished last among the five candidates, garnering only 3 percent of the total vote.

Connections with militant Islamism
A number of journalists and commentators have reported that Hamzah is believed to offer support for militant Muslim groups as a way of gaining political support from them. In 2002, Bill Guerin, in an opinion piece in the Asia Times wrote, "Hamzah ... is widely seen as blatantly vying for support from among Indonesian Muslims, including the militant groups, to strengthen his run for the presidency in the country's next general elections in 2004."

Hamzah is also reported to be as an apologist for and friend of Abu Bakar Bashir, who is the spiritual leader for the terrorist organization Jemaah Islamiyah. While vice president, Hamzah made a public show of inviting Bashir to dinner, and visited his jihadist pesantren (religious school) in Pondok Ngruki. Hamzah denied that Bashir was connected to terrorism up until Bashir's arrest in October 2002, and was quoted as saying before Bashir's arrest "If you want to arrest Abu Bakar Bashir .. you will have to deal with me first."

In October 2002, an article in Time stated "That clerics like Abubakar [Bashir] have powerful military and political allies is no secret: the nation's Vice-President Hamzah Haz is one of them." Time reported that Hamzah described his relationship with Bashir and Laskar Jihad leader Jafar Umar Thalib as "very close", but Time added, "many see this relationship as a purely political ploy to woo Muslim voters ahead of the 2004 election." Hamzah, although he "has a reputation as a wily politician" nevertheless "will be remembered for a particularly ill-judged speech before Muslim clerics at Abubakar's Solo boarding school in May [2002]", the newsmagazine reported. During that visit Hamzah was also reported to have said, "If they can prove there are terrorists here I'll be the first to order an arrest", and then stepped down from the podium and kissed Abubakar on both cheeks.

In 2002, an Australian academic cited Hamzah as the "best example" of Islamic politicians in Indonesia "prepared to play the extremist card to attract extra votes". Hamzah "has supported Jemaah Islamiyah and has even been instrumental in having its members released from detention in the past", according to Tim Lindsey, director of the Asian Law Centre at the University of Melbourne. "He has also openly accused the CIA and the United States of carrying out the Bali bombing."

Denial of terrorists in the country
In 2002 Hamzah gave an interview to the Australian Broadcasting Corporation (ABC), which broadcast it on 23 October. In a voice-over played during the television interview, an ABC journalist said, "Before the Bali bombing, Vice President Hamzah Haz insisted there were no terrorists in Indonesia. After the bombing, he gave this extraordinary justification for that position:"

Hamzah Haz press statement: "If I as vice president said that Indonesia has terrorists, no one would come to Indonesia, no investors would come."

The ABC interviewer then told Hamzah: "In light of Bali, that would seem a reprehensible comment, if you knew that people were here."

Hamzah responded: "It's not true that I protect them and I don't regret what I said, but I said it in the past – it relates to the past. But now if there is a connection we want to know whether it is true that Indonesia has a terrorist network."

Accusation of United States terrorism
On 3 September 2003 Hamzah stated, "Actually, who is the terrorist, who is against human rights? The answer is the United States because they attacked Iraq. Moreover, it is the terrorist king, waging war."

According to The Sydney Morning Herald, Hamzah's statement was "a scathing attack that echoed the language of many of the Bali bombers". Hamzah had also been criticised for publicly associating with several of Indonesia's more hardline Islamic leaders, including Bashir, although after the Bali terrorist attack Hamzah severed those ties. Soon after Hamzah's remarks, Riza Sihbudi, a political analyst at the Indonesian Institute of Sciences, told the Detik news service that Hamzah seemed to be chasing votes. "He should not have spoken like that as he is the Vice-President", Sihbudi said.

Al Jazeera reported the day after Hamzah's statement that "There has yet to be a US reaction to the well-known firebrand's comments."

Personal life
The Office of the Vice President officially states that Hamzah has two wives, Asmaniah (b. 27 July 1942), and Titin Kartini (b. 4 May 1946), with whom he has a total of 12 children. However, another source states Haz has a third wife, Soraya, whom he does not officially acknowledge, and with whom he has a further three children.

Hamzah Haz's son Nur Agus Haz, is a member of parliament for the United Development Party

Degree
He is sometimes known as Dr. Hamzah; he is reported to have obtained a PhD from American World University, an internet diploma mill, for US$1,200.

Notes

References
Barton, Greg.(2005) Jemaah Islamiyah: Radical Islam in Indonesia Sydney: University of New South Wales Press.

1940 births
Living people
People from Ketapang Regency
Indonesian people of Malay descent
United Development Party politicians
Chairmen of the United Development Party
Vice presidents of Indonesia
Indonesian Islamists
People using unaccredited degrees